Francisco Carrere (6 January 1913 – 9 August 1992) was an Argentine equestrian. He competed in two events at the 1948 Summer Olympics.

References

External links
 

1913 births
1992 deaths
Argentine male equestrians
Olympic equestrians of Argentina
Equestrians at the 1948 Summer Olympics
Place of birth missing